Yeniköy is a village in Toroslar district  of Mersin Province, Turkey. (Toroslar district center is in Greater Mersin). At , it is situated in the forests of the Taurus Mountains to the east of the Müftü River valley. The population of the village was 306  in 2012. The main agricultural crops are fruits such as cherries and peaches.

References

Villages in Toroslar District